SpellCaster is a Master System video game that stars a character named Kane. It had a sequel, Mystic Defender.

Plot
The game starts when Kane is summoned by Daikak, the great leader of the Summit Temple, to stop a war between factions of warlords. The player explores temples and defeats enemies like ghosts, ninja and feral beasts. There are also villages to explore and people to talk to as the player assembles clues on who desecrated his home town's temple and killed its guardians. The quest takes the player across medieval Japan and to the Underworld.

Reception 

S: The Sega Magazine gave the game a positive review, giving it a 91% score.

References

External links

1989 video games
Fantasy video games
Sega video games
Master System games
Master System-only games
Video games set in feudal Japan
Video games developed in Japan